Judge Stephens may refer to:

Albert Lee Stephens Jr. (1913–2001), judge of the United States District Courts for the Southern and Central Districts of California
Albert Lee Stephens Sr. (1874–1965), judge of the United States Court of Appeals for the Ninth Circuit
Harold Montelle Stephens (1886–1955), judge of the United States Court of Appeals for the District of Columbia Circuit
William Stephens (judge) (1752–1819), judge of the United States District Court for the District of Georgia

See also
Justice Stephens (disambiguation)
Judge Stevens (disambiguation)